Nathaniel Gates Hedges was an American politician.

Nathaniel Gates Hedges was a native of Maine, born to parents Matthew and Abigail Oak Hedges on 23 April 1811. He settled in Sioux City, Iowa, where he was involved in farming and real estate, before moving to Lee County, Iowa. While a resident of Lee County, Hedges was director of National Bank in Des Moines, and Lee County sheriff. Between 1860 and 1862, Hedges was a Democratic member of the Iowa House of Representatives from District 1. Hedges contested the 1865 Iowa Senate election, and was elected to serve District 1 of the Iowa Senate until 1870.

References

19th-century American businesspeople
Businesspeople from Iowa
American real estate businesspeople
Politicians from Sioux City, Iowa
1811 births
Year of death missing
19th-century American politicians
Democratic Party Iowa state senators
People from Lee County, Iowa